The Utrecht Journal of International and European Law is a biannual peer-reviewed open access law journal covering international and European law. It is affiliated with Utrecht University and Urios.

The journal was established in 1981 as a student magazine titled Merkourios, containing summaries of study-trips, conferences, and other issues related to Urios, an association for international and European law. Since then it has evolved from a magazine into a formal, academic law journal. This development was finalised in 2009, when peer-review was officially integrated into the reviewing process. The journal obtained its current name in 2013, and is published by Ubiquity Press.

A complete log of all previous issues is hosted by HeinOnline.

External links
 

International law journals
Law journals edited by students
Biannual journals
Creative Commons Attribution-licensed journals
European law journals
Utrecht University
Ubiquity Press academic journals